Mannar Vagaiyara is a 2018 Indian Tamil-language action drama film written and directed by G. Boopathy Pandian. The film is produced by actor Vimal, who also stars alongside Anandhi, while Prabhu, Saranya Ponvannan, Chandini Tamilarasan and Karthik Kumar amongst others appear in supporting roles. Featuring music composed by Jakes Bejoy and cinematography by P. G. Muthiah and Sooraj Nallusami, the film was released on 26 January 2018 and become a decent hit by completing 100 days of theatrical run.

Plot
Govindaraja Mooriyar is a respected person in a town living with his wife and two sons – Arivazhagan and Madhi. Ilayarani also hails from a nearby town living with her parents Rajangam, and Kalaiyarasi as well as an elder sister Selvarani and elder brother JP. Madhi falls in love with Ilayarani which she reciprocates.

Karunakaran is a local business man and a relative of Rajangam, however, enmity prevails between both families. Kalaiyarasi plans to unite both families by getting Selvarani married to Karunakaran’s brother. To everyone’s surprise, Selvarani elopes on the day of her wedding along with Arivazhagan with the help of Madhi. It is revealed that Selvarani and Arivzhagan are in love. Knowing this, both families disown the couple forcing them to stay alone in the outskirts of the town with the help of Madhi. Selvarani is conceived and Madhi convinces both his and Selvarani's families and are united.

Karunakaran suggests his brother to be married to Ilayarani for which everyone agrees. Govindaraj learns of Madhi and Ilayarani's love affair and is infuriated. Madhi decides to sacrifice his love so that Rajangam and Karunakaran's families can be united. Madhi promises Govindaraj that he will move away from Ilayarani's life. On the day of Ilayarani's wedding, she goes missing and Govindaraj doubts Madhi as he has planned something. However, Madhi denies any wrong doing but everyone in the marriage hall learns of the love between Madhi and Ilayarani.

Finally, it is found that Ilayarani was still staying at her house and calls Rajangam and JP requesting to cancel the wedding as she is not interested in this.  Everyone decides to get Ilayarani married to Madhi and they are united at the end. Madhi feels sorry for Karunakaran’s brother as his wedding is cancelled twice because of him and gets him married to another girl.

Cast

 Vimal as Madhiyazhagan Mooriyar
 Anandhi as llaiyarani
 Prabhu as Aiya/Govindaraja Mooriyar, Madhiyazhagan's father
 Saranya Ponvannan as Kalaiyarasi (Ilaiyarani's mother)
 Chandini Tamilarasan as Selvarani Arivazhagan
 Robo Shankar as Attack Durai
 Karthik Kumar as Arivazhagan Mooriyar
 Meera Krishnan as Madhi and Arivu's mother
 Jayaprakash as Rajangam, Ilaiyarani's father
 Singampuli as Puli Mootta
 Vamsi Krishna as JP, Ilaiyarani's brother
 Neelima Rani as Easwari JP
 Abhishek Vinod as Karunakaran
 Rethika Srinivas as Karunakaran's wife
 Sathya as Karunakaran's brother
 Sangili Murugan as Sangili Thatha
 Karate Raja as JP's henchman
 Swaminathan as Priest 
 Bharathi Kannan
 Vichu Vishwanath
 Singamuthu
 Sai Dheena
 T. P. Radhamani 
 Madhurai Raja
 Ilamparithi
 Supergood Subramani
 Yogi Babu as Kannan (special appearance)
 Maria Juliana in a guest appearance

Production
In May 2015, Boopathy Pandian announced that his next film would be a "comedy entertainer" featuring Vimal in the lead role, while actor Sathyaraj would play Vimal's father in the film. Escape Artists Motion Pictures were revealed as the film's producers and stated that the film would begin production during late 2015. The film began production during December 2015 in Alathur, Thanjavur Pattukottai, Madukkur, Keeramangalam and Thambikkottai, with Karthik Kumar joining the team. The film went through a change of producers in early 2016, with Arasu Films briefly attached to the project before Vemal took over as the main producer with his newly launched A3V Cinemaz. He thus chose to prioritise the production of Mannar Vagaiyara and opted against working on other projects simultaneously. As a result of his busy schedule, Prabhu replaced Sathyaraj in the film, while Anandhi was signed on as the female lead. Soori was supposed to work on the film, but his busy schedule meant that Robo Shankar later took the role, and parodied Dhanush's character in Maari (2015) as a part of his character.

Production continued throughout 2016 but was delayed in December following the effects of Cyclone Vardah. The team planned to release the film for the Pongal season of 2018, but were forced to delay due to a lack of screens. Vimal had written an emotional letter to theatre owners to screen his film for Pongal, but later accepted to delay the film for two weeks.
The Satellite rights of this movie sold to Zee Tamil.

Soundtrack

The film's music was composed by Jakes Bejoy, and the soundtrack was released on 3 January 2018 through New Music.

Release
Tamil Nadu theatrical rights of the film were sold for 5.5 crore.

References

External links 

2018 films
Indian action comedy films
2010s Tamil-language films
2018 masala films
Films directed by Boopathy Pandian
2018 action comedy films